South Hartwick is a hamlet in Otsego County, New York, United States. South Hartwick is served by ZIP code 13348.

The hamlet was once served by the Southern New York Railroad, an electric trolley line that ran from Oneonta to Mohawk.

References

Hamlets in Otsego County, New York
Hamlets in New York (state)